A noble house is an aristocratic family or kinship group, either currently or historically of national or international significance, and usually associated with one or more hereditary titles, the most senior of which will be held by the "Head of the House" or patriarch. The concept is comparable with that of an aristocratic clan, and can be used informally to describe non-European ruling families.

When a reigning monarch is a member of a noble house, such as the House of Windsor, that house can also be considered a royal house. Many noble houses (such as the Houses of York and Lancaster) have birthed dynasties and have historically been considered royal houses, but in a contemporary sense, these houses may lose this status when the dynasty ends and their familial relationship with the position of power is superseded. A royal house is a type of noble house, and they are not separate or mutually exclusive entities.

Many of these houses are of many different countries such as House of Butler which has held power and lands in countries such as France, Ireland, Germany and the UK.

United Kingdom
 House of Aberffraw
 House of Abney-Hastings
 House of Addison
House of Allenby
House of Anson
House of Anwyl
House of Arden
House of Ashley-Cooper
House of Asquith
House of Astor
House of Baden-Powell
House of Bailey
House of Baldwin
House of Balfour
House of Baring
 House of Basset
House of Bathurst
 House of Beauchamp
 House of Beauclerk
 House of Beaufort
 House of Beaumont
 House of Benn
House of Bennett
 House of Bentinck
 House of Berkeley
 House of Bohun
 House of Boleyn
House of Bouverie
House of Bridgeman
 House of Bruce
House of Brudenell-Bruce
 House of Buccleuch
 House of Burdett-Coutts
House of Byng
 House of Byron
House of Cadogan
House of Cairns
House of Cameron
 House of Campbell
House of Capell
House of Carnegie
House of Carpenter
House of Cathcart
 House of Cavendish
 House of Cecil
 House of Charteris
House of Chetwynd-Talbot
House of Cholmondeley
House of Churchill
House of Clive
House of Coke
House of Compton
House of Cooper
House of Corbet
House of Cornwallis
House of Coventry
House of Crichton
House of Crichton-Stuart
 House of Croft
House of Cunliffe-Lister
 House of De Burgh
 House of De Carteret
 House of De Clare
 House of De Montfort
House of De Ros
 House of De Vere
 House of De Warrenne
 House of Delaval
 House of Douglas
 House of Drummond
House of Dundas
 House of Dunkeld
House of Eden
House of Edgcumbe
 House of Egerton
House of Eliot
House of Fairfax
House of Fane
House of Feilding
House of Ferrers
House of Fiennes
House of Fiennes-Clinton
House of Finch
House of Finch-Hatton
House of FitzAlan
House of FitzClarence
House of FitzGeorge
House of FitzHamon
House of FitzHugh
 House of FitzJames
House of FitzRoy
House of FitzWalter
 House of FitzWilliam
House of Fortescue
House of Fox-Strangways
House of Freeman-Mitford
House of Gathorne-Hardy
House of Godolphin
 House of Godwin
 House of Gordon
House of Gordon-Lennox
 House of Gough-Calthorpe
 House of Graham
House of Greville
 House of Grey
House of Grimston
House of Grosvenor
 House of Hamilton
 House of Hanbury-Tracy
House of Harley
House of Harris
 House of Hastings
 House of Hay
 House of Herbert
House of Hervey
House of Hicks Beach
House of Hobart
House of Hogg
House of Hope
 House of Howard
House of Howe
House of Hughes
House of Hungerford
House of Hussey-Montagu
House of Irvine
House of Isaacs
House of Jellicoe
House of Johnstone
House of Kennedy
House of Kerr
House of Kinnaird
House of Knýtlinga
House of Lambton
 House of Lancaster
House of Lascelles
House of Le Despencer
House of Legge
House of Lennox
House of Leslie
 House of Leveson-Gower
 House of Lindsay
 House of Longe
House of Lowther
House of Lumley
House of Lyon
 House of Lyttelton
House of Lytton
House of MacAlpin
 House of Macdonald
 House of MacLellan
House of Manners
House of Manners-Sutton
House of Marsham
House of Monckton
House of Money-Coutts
 House of Montagu
House of Montagu-Stuart-Wortley-Mackenzie
House of Montgomery
House of Morgan
House of Mortimer
House of Mosley
House of Mountbatten
 House of Mowbray
House of Murray
House of Nall-Cain
 House of Neville
House of Noel
House of Normandy
House of North
House of Northcote
House of Onslow
House of Osborne
House of Paget
House of Palmer
House of Parker
House of Paulet
House of Peel
House of Pelham
House of Pelham-Clinton
House of Pepys
 House of Percy
House of Petty-FitzMaurice
House of Philipps
House of Phipps
House of Pitt
 House of Plantagenet
House of Pratt
House of Ramsay
House of Rich
House of Robinson
House of Rodney
 House of Roper-Curzon
House of Rous
 House of Russell
 House of Ruthven
House of Ryder
House of Sackville
House of Scott
House of Scudamore 
 House of Seymour
 House of Seymour-Conway
House of Shirley
House of Sinclair
 House of Spencer
House of Spencer-Churchill
House of Stanhope
 House of Stanley
 House of Stratford
 House of Stuart
 House of St. Leger
House of Sudeley
 House of Swinton
 House of Talbot
House of Thynne
 House of Tollemache
 House of Townshend
 House of Tudor
 House of Twisleton-Wykeham-Fiennes
 House of Tyndall
 House of Vane
 House of Vane-Tempest-Stewart
House of Vernon
House of Villiers
House of Vivian
House of Waldegrave
House of Wallace
House of Wallop
House of Walpole
House of Ward
House of Wedgwood
House of Wellesley
House of Wentworth
 House of Wessex
 House of Williams-Wynn
House of Windsor
House of Windsor-Clive
House of Wodehouse
 House of Wood
 House of Woodville
 House of York
 House of Zouche

France
 House of Albret
 House of Amboise
 House of Anjou
 House of Armagnac
 House of Artois
 House of Aumont
 House of Avesnes
 House of Bauffremont
 House of Baux
 House of Beauharnais
 House of Bethune
 House of Blacas
 House of Blois
 House of Bonaparte
 House of Bourbon
 House of Broglie
 House of Capet
 House of Choiseul
 House of Clermont-Tonnerre
 House of Crussol d'Uzès
 House of Courtenay
 House of Dreux
 House of Évreux
 House of Foix
 House of Fouché d'Otrante
 House of Gramont
 House of Grimaldi
 House of Guise
 House of Harcourt
 House of La Fayette
 House of La Force
 House of La Rochefoucauld
 House of La Tour d'Auvergne
 House of La Trémoille
 House of Lorraine
 House of Montfort
 House of Montmorency
 House of Montrichard
 House of Monpezat
 House of Noailles
 House of Normandy
 House of Orléans
 House of Pineton de Chambrun
 House of Poitiers
 House of Polignac
 House of Rohan
 House of Tabouillot
 House of Talhouët
 House of Talleyrand-Périgord
 House of Valois

Holy Roman Empire and Germany
 House of Abensberg-Traun
 House of Ascania
 House of Amsberg
 House of Auersperg
 House of Babenberg
 House of Battenberg
 House of Bentheim
 House of Bibra
 House of Bismarck
 House of Breuberg
 House of Campenhausen
 House of Czernin
 House of Clary and Aldringen
 House of Colloredo-Mansfeld
 House of Dietrichstein
 House of Dohna
 House of Eggenberg
 House of Eltz
 House of Esterházy
 House of Falkenstein
 House of Finck von Finckenstein
 House of Franckenstein
 House of Fugger-Babenhausen
 House of Fürstenberg
 House of Gravenreuth
 House of Glücksburg
 House of Guttenberg
 House of Habsburg
 House of Hanover
 House of Harrach
 House of Henckel von Donnersmarck
 House of Hesse
 House of Hohenberg
 House of Hohenlohe
 House of Hohenstaufen
 House of Hohenzollern
 House of Isenburg
 House of Ketteler
 House of Khevenhüller
 House of Kinsky
 House of La Marck
 House of Leiningen
 House of Lichnowsky
 House of Liechtenstein
 House of Limburg-Stirum
 House of Lippe
 House of Lobkowicz
 House of Löwenstein-Wertheim
 House of Luxembourg
 House of Mecklenburg
 House of Metternich
 House of Nassau
 House of Oettingen-Oettingen
 House of Oldenburg
 House of Orsini-Rosenberg
 House of Ortenburg
 House of Pappenheim
 House of Putbus
 House of Puttkamer
 House of Rennenkampff
 House of Reuss
 House of Salian
 House of Salm
 House of Saxe-Coburg and Gotha
 House of Sayn-Wittgenstein
 House of Schönborn
 House of Schönburg
 House of Schwarzburg
 House of Schwarzenberg
 House of Sinzendorf
 House of Solms-Braunfels
 House of Starhemberg
 House of Stolberg
 House of Thun and Hohenstein
 House of Thurn and Taxis
 House of Urach
 House of Waldburg
 House of Waldeck and Pyrmont
 House of  Waldstein
 House of Welf
 House of Wettin
 House of Windisch-Graetz
 House of Wittelsbach
 House of Württemberg
 House of Zähringen

Arabia and the Levant 

 House of Abaza
 House of Al-Afifi
House of Abu Lahum
House of Al-Alawiyya
 House of Al-Ahmar
 House of Al-ash-Sheikh
 House of Al-Atrash
 House of Al-Falahi
 House of Al-Falasi
House of Al-Fayez
 House of Al-Fa'iz
 House of Al-Gilani
 House of Al-Harhara
 House of Al-Hashim
 House of Al-Husayni
 House of Al-Iryani
 House of Al-Jabriyun
 House of Al-Jarwani
 House of Al-Jayyusi
 House of Al-Maktoum
 House of Al-Mualla
 House of Al-Nabhani
 House of Al-Nahyan
 House of Al-Nuaimi
 House of Al-Qasimi
 House of Al-Qu'aiti
 House of Al-Rasheed
 House of Al-Sabah
 House of Al-Said
 House of Al-Saud
 House of Al-Sha'lan
 House of Al-Sharqi
House of Al-Sudairi
House of Al-Uyūnīyūn
House of Al-Ya'rubi
 House of Al-Zaydina
 House of Arslan
 House of Buhtur
 House of Chehab
 House of Jumblatt
 House of Khalifah
 House of Ma'n

The Low Countries of the Habsburg Netherlands
 House of Arenberg
 House of Baillet
 House of Beaufort-Spontin
 House of Belgium
 House of Chalon
 House of Chasteler
 House of Chimay
 House of Croÿ
 House of Dampierre
 House of De Borchgrave
 House of De Lannoy
 House of De Witte
 House of D'Udekem
 House of Egmond
 House of Goubau
 House of Hénin
 House of Hornes
 House of Ligne
 House of Looz-Corswarem
 House of Merode
 House of Nassau-Weilburg
 House of Orange-Nassau
 House of Parthon
 House of Snoy et d'Oppuers
 House of Spoelberch
 House of Terlinden
 House of Trazegnies
 House of Ursel
 House of Valois-Burgundy
 House of van de Werve
 House of van der Noot
 House of Van Rechteren
 House of Van Renesse
 House of Van Voorst tot Voorst
 House of Van Wassenaer
Seven Noble Houses of Brussels : 
House of Coudenbergh
House of Roodenbeke
House of Serhuyghs
House of Serroelofs 
House of Sleeus
House of Steenweeghs
House of Sweerts

Italy and The Papal States
 House of Alberti
 House of Aldobrandeschi
 House of Aldobrandini
 House of Altoviti
 House of Anscarids
 House of Barberini
 House of Barbiano di Belgiojoso
 House of Bardi
 House of Boncompagni
 House of Borghese
 House of Borgia
 House of Borromeo
 House of Bourbon-Parma
 House of Bourbon-Two Sicilies
 House of Caetani
House of Canossa
 House of Caracciolo
 House of Chigi
 House of Colonna
 House of Cybo
 House of Della Gherardesca
 House of Della Rovere
House of Della Torre
 House of Doria-Pamphili-Landi
 House of Erba-Odescalchi
 House of Este
 House of Farnese
 House of Fieschi
 House of Fisichella
 House of Gherardini
 House of Gonzaga
 House of Hauteville
House of Loredan
 House of Malaspina
 House of Mancini
 House of Massimo
 House of Mattei
 House of Medici
 House of Montefeltro
 House of Orsini
 House of Pallavicini
 House of Pazzi
 House of Pignatelli
 House of Ruffo
 House of Ruspoli
 House of Sacchetti
House of Salamon 
 House of Salviati
 House of Sanseverino
 House of Savoy
 House of Sforza
 House of Simonetti
 House of Spinola
 House of Strozzi
 House of Torlonia
 House of Venier
 House of Ventimiglia
 House of Visconti

Spain and Portugal
 House of Alba
 House of Alburquerque
 House of Álvarez-Cuevas
 House of Argavieso
 House of Barcelona
 House of Bettencourt
 House of Braganza
 House of Bourbon-Anjou
 House of Cadaval
 House of Camondo
 House of Carrillo
 House of Castro
 House of Correia
 House of Corte-Real
 House of Cotoner
 House of Enríquez
 House of Entença
 House of Gonçalves da Câmara
 House of Godoy
 House of Haro
 House of Hoyos
 House of Íñiguez
 House of Jiménez
 House of la Cerda
 House of Lara
 House of Lasso de la Vega
 House of Latas
 House of Lecubarri
 House of Maia
 House of Marcoartu
 House of Medina Sidonia
 House of Medinaceli
 House of Méndez de Sotomayor
 House of Mendoza
 House of Montcada
 House of Moctezuma
 House of Nápoles
 House of Narro
 House of Olivares
 House of Osorio
 House of Osuna
 House of Pardo
 House of Romay
 House of Santcliment
 House of Silva
 House of Sousa
 House of Tagle
 House of Trastámara
 House of Zúñiga

Polish–Lithuanian Commonwealth
 House of Czartoryski
 House of Czetwertyński
 House of Giedroyć
 House of Griffins
 House of Jabłonowski
 House of Jagiellon
 House of Kalinowski
 House of Koniecpolski
 House of Krasiński
 House of Leszczyński
 House of Lubomirski
 House of Miełżyński
 House of Mniszech
 House of Mystkowski
 House of Ogiński
 House of Opaliński
 House of Ossoliński
 House of Ostrogski
 House of Piast
 House of Poniatowski
 House of Potocki
 House of Radziwiłł
 House of Sanguszko
 House of Sapieha
 House of Sobieski
 House of Sułkowski
 House of Wiśniowiecki
 House of Zamoyski
 House of Zasławski

Holy Crown Lands Of Hungary (Modern Day Hungary, Transylvania and Slovakia)
 House of Aba
 House of Andechs
 House of Andrássy
 House of Apor
 House of Apponyi
 House of Báthory
 House of Batthyány-Strattmann
 House of Bebek
 House of Bethlen
 House of Csányi
 House of Eötvös
 House of Ernuszt
 House of Esterházy
 House of Festetics
 House of Forgách
 House of Garai
 House of Hunyadi
 House of Kálnoky
 House of Lázár
 House of Mattyasovszky
 House of Mikes
 House of Monok
 House of Nádasdy
 House of Pálffy de Erdöd
 House of Perneszy
 House of Podmanitzky 
 House of Pop
 House of Ráday
 House of Rákóczi
 House of Révay
 House of Rosty
 House of Széchenyi
 House of Szilágyi
 House of Teleki
 House of Thurzó
 House of Tisza
 House of Ugron
 House of Zápolya
 House of Zichy

Carpathian states (Wallachia and Moldavia)
 House of Basarab
 House of Bogdan-Mușat
 House of Brâncoveanu
 House of Brătianu
 House of Cantacuzino
 House of Cantemir
 House of Caradja
 House of Craiovești
 House of Dănești
 House of Drăculești
 House of Dragoș
 House of Ghica
 House of Kogălniceanu
 House of Moruzi
 House of Movilă
 House of Racoviță
 House of Rosetti
 House of Sturdza
 House of Șoldănești
 House of Văcărescu
 House of Ypsilantis

Nordic Countries
 House of Awaldzstadom
 House of Ahlefeldt
House of Benkestok
House of Bernadotte
 House of Bjelke
 House of Danneskiold-Samsøe
 House of Estridsen
 House of Essen
 House of Fabritius de Tengnagel
 House of Falkenskiold
 House of Falsen
 House of Fersen
 House of Gyldenstierne
House of Gyllenhaal
 House of Güldencrone
 House of Igelström
 House of Knagenhjelm
 House of Knýtlinga
 House of Koskull
 House of Lagergren
 House of Løvenørn
 House of Mannerheim
 House of Munso
 House of Munthe af Morgenstierne
 House of Neergaard
 House of Oxenstierna
 House of Reventlow
 House of Rosenkrantz
House of Rosensverd
 House of Schleswig-Holstein-Sonderburg-Augustenburg
 House of Schulman
 House of Staël von Holstein
 House of Stockfleth
 House of Svanenhielm
 House of Sverre
 House of Vasa
 House of Werenskiold
 House of Wrangel

Russia, Georgia and Eastern Slavic States
 House of Abashidze
 House of Abashidze-Gorlenko
 House of Amilakhvari
 House of Amirejibi
 House of Avalishvili
 House of Bagration
 House of Baratashvili
 House of Barclay de Tolly
 House of Belosselsky-Belozersky
 House of Belsky
 House of Chavchavadze
 House of Chichua
 House of Chikovani
 House of Dadeshkeliani
 House of Dadiani
 House of Demidov
 House of Diasamidze
 House of Dolgorukov
 House of Dondukov
 House of Drutsky
 House of Durnovo
 House of Gagarin
 House of Garsevanishvili
 House of Gelovani
 House of Golitsyn
 House of Gorchakov
 House of Guramishvili
 House of Gurgenidze
 House of  Gurieli
 House of Izmaylov
 House of Jaqeli
 House of Javakhishvili
 House of Khilkov
 House of Lieven
 House of Lyapunov
 House of Menshikov
 House of Meshchersky
 House of Mikeladze
 House of Mstislavsky
 House of Obolensky
 House of Odoyevsky
 House of Orbeliani
 House of Orlov
 House of Pahlen
 House of Pavlenishvili
 House of Razumovsky
 House of Repnin
 House of Romanov
 House of Romodanovsky
 House of Rurik
 House of Rzhevsky
 House of Shalikashvili
 House of Sheremetev
 House of Shervashidze
 House of Stroganov
 House of Tolstoy
 House of Trubetskoy
 House of Tsereteli
 House of Vorontsov

 House of Yuryevsky
 House of Yusupov
 House of Zubov

Albania
House of Arianiti
House of Kastrioti
House of Muzaka
House of Zogu
House of Dukagjini
House of Thopia
House of Gropa
House of Progoni
House of Balsha
House of Zenevisi
House of Shpata
House of Zaharia
House of Spani
House of Mataranga
Begolli family

Western Balkans states (Bosnia, Croatia, Montenegro, Serbia)

Bosnian
 House of Boričević
 House of Hrvatinić
 House of Šantić (Santic)
 House of Kosača
 House of Kotromanić
 House of Kulinić
 House of Ljubibratić
 House of Miloradović
 House of Nikolić
 House of Pavlović
 House of Radivojević
 House of Sanković
 House of Zlatonosović

Croatian 
 House of Berislavić
 House of Crnković
 House of Drašković
 House of Frankopan
 House of Jelačić
 House of Kačić
 House of Keglević
 House of Kurjaković
 House of Nelipić
 House of Pejačević
 House of Trpimirović
 House of Šubić
 House of Talovac
 House of Zrinski

Montenegrin 
 House of Balšić
 House of Crnojević
 House of Petrović-Njegoš

Serbian 
 House of Bakić
 House of Branković
 House of Dejanović
 House of Golemović
 House of Karađorđević
 House of Jakšić
 House of Lazarević
 House of Mrnjavčević
 House of Musić
 House of Nemanjić
 House of Obrenović
 House of Paskačić
 House of Preljubović
 House of Rastislalić
 House of Vlastimirović
 House of Vojislavljević
 House of Vukanović

Greece, The Byzantine Empire and Crusader States of the Levant
 House of Angelos
 House of Bagratuni
 House of Calogerà
 House of Châteaudun
 House of Châtillon
 House of De la Roche
 House of Doukas
 House of Grenier
 House of Gattilusi
 House of Ghisi
 House of Hauteville
 House of Ibelin
 House of Kantakouzenos
 House of Komnenos
 House of Kourkouas
 House of Laskaris
 House of Lusignan
 House of Madi
 House of Maleinos
 House of Mavrocordatos
 Houses of Montlhéry and Le Puiset
 House of Palaiologos
 House of Philanthropenos
 House of Phokas
 House of Rubenid
 House of Saint Omer
 House of Sanudo
 House of Skleros
 House of Theotokis
 House of Tocco
 House of Toulouse
 House of Vatatzes
 House of Venieris
 House of Villehardouin
 House of Ypsilantis

Ireland
 House of Beresford
 House of Boyle
 House of Brabazon
 House of Browne
 House of Butler
 House of Chichester
 House of Conyngham
 House of FitzDermot
House of FitzGerald
House of Fitzmaurice
House of FitzPatrick
House of Forbes
House of Gore
House of Guinness
House of Hamilton
House of Hill
House of Horsley-Beresford
House of Jocelyn
House of King
House of Lambart
House of Loftus
 House of MacCarthy
 House of MacDermot
 House of MacMurrough Kavanagh
 House of McGillycuddy
 House of McInerney
 House of Meade
 House of Moore
 House of Nugent
 House of O'Brien
 House of O'Byrne
 House of O'Callaghan
 House of O'Conor
 House of O'Donnell
 House of O'Donovan
 House of Ó Faircheallaigh
 House of Ó Faoláin
 House of Ó Fearghail
 House of O'Neill
 House of O'Rourke
 House of O'Morchoe
 House of O'Connell
 House of O'Dwyer
 House of O'Sullivan
 House of O'Toole
 House of Pakenham
 House of Petty
 House of Ponsonby
 House of Power
 House of Savile
 House of Stopford
 House of Taylour
 House of Tottenham
 House of Tracy
 House of Turnour
 House of Wellesley

Nepal 

 Panday Dynasty
 Basnet Dynasty
 Rana Dynasty
 Thapa Dynasty
 Shah Dynasty
 Malla Dynasty
 Chand Dynasty
 Katyuri Clan
 Shakya Clan

The Americas

Brazil
 House of Braganza
 House of Orléans-Braganza

Haiti
 House of Christophe
 House of Dessalines
 House of Soulouque

Mexico
 House of Cámara
 House of Iturbide
 House of Moctezuma
 Villagómez family

Africa

Benin 
 House of De Souza
 House of Aladaxonou

Burundi 
 House of Ntwero

Cameroon 
 Njoya

The Congo
 House of Kinkanga
 House of Kilukeni
 House of Kimpanzu
 House of Kwilu

Ghana
 Oyoko dynasty

Egypt and Sudan 
 Muhammad Ali dynasty

Ethiopia 
 House of Solomon
 Zagwe dynasty

Eswatini 
 House of Dlamini

Lesotho 
 House of Moshoeshoe

Libya 
 House of Shennib

Madagascar 
 Andriana
 Hova dynasty

Mali 
 Keita dynasty

Morocco 
 'Alawi dynasty

Nigeria 
 Abass
 Ademola
 Dantata
 Ezekwe
 Eweka
 dan Fodio
 Kanemi
 Nnama
 Nnofo
 Ransome-Kuti
 Sayfawa dynasty
 Olagbegi
 Olukere
 Oduduwa
 Oranyan

Rwanda 
 Abanyiginya clan

Senegambia 
 Guelowar
 Joof
 The Royal House of Boureh Gnilane Joof
 The Royal House of Jogo Siga Joof
 The Royal House of Semou Njekeh Joof
 Faye
 Joos Maternal Dynasty

South Africa 
 House of Zulu

Zanzibar 
 House of Busaid

Polynesia

Hawaii
 House of Kalākaua
 House of Kamehameha
 House of Kawānanakoa
 House of Keoua

Samoa
 Tupua Tamasese
 Malietoa 
 Mata'afa
 Tuimaleali'ifano

Tonga
 House of Tupou

References

Lists of families